Country Code: +509
International Call Prefix: 00

Nationally Significant Numbers (NSN): eight digits.

Format: +509 XX XX XXXX

Telephone numbers in the Republic of Haiti increased from seven to eight digits on 1 March 2008.

Number plan

References

Haiti
Communications in Haiti